Ercan Yazgan (4 April 1946 – 8 March 2018) was a Turkish comedian and political satirist. He was widely regarded as one of Turkey's most prominent and respected comedians. He starred in numerous movies and various TV-series. He died on 8 March 2018, at the age of 72 from multiple organ failure.

Filmography 

 Bana Masal Anlatma - 2015
 İffet - 2011 
 Kardelen - 2010 
 Hanımın Çiftliği - 2010
 Nekrüt - 2008
 Yalancı Yarim - 2007
 Ahh İstanbul - 2006 
 Tatil Aşkları - 2004 
 Altın Kafes - 2004 
 Hayat Bilgisi - 2003 
 Sırlar Dünyası / Sır Kapısı - 2002
 Aşk Meydan Savaşı - 2002 
 Balalayka - 2000 
 Duruşma - 1999
 Sevda Kondu - 1996 
 Kaygısızlar - 1994 
 Yazlıkçılar - 1993 
 Bir Milyara Bir Çocuk - 1990 
 Bizimkiler - 1989 
 Kabadayı - 1986 
 Perihan Abla - 1986 
 Üç İstanbul - 1983 
 Arkadaşım - 1982 
 Dokunmayın Şabanıma - 1979 
 Ölüm Görevi - 1978 
 Sen Aşk Nedir Bilir Misin - 1977 
 Sarmaş Dolaş - 1977 
 Tatlı Kaçık - 1977 
 İzin - 1975 
 Hüdaverdi-Pırtık - 1971
 Susuz Yaz - 1963

References

1946 births
2018 deaths
Best Supporting Actor Golden Orange Award winners
Deaths from multiple organ failure
Turkish comedians
Turkish male film actors
People from Sinop, Turkey